Cost reduction is the process used by companies to reduce their costs and increase their profits. Depending on a company’s services or products, the strategies can vary. Every decision in the product development process affects cost: design is typically considered to account for 70–80% of the final cost of a project such as an engineering project or the construction of a building.

Companies typically launch a new product without focusing too much on cost. Cost becomes more important when competition increases and price becomes a differentiator in the market.

The importance of cost reduction in relation to other strategic business goals is often debated.

Cost reduction strategies
 Supplier consolidation: see examples in the aerospace manufacturing industry
 Component consolidation
 Low-cost country sourcing
 Request for quotations (RFQ)
 Supplier cost breakdown analysis
 Function cost analysis / Value analysis / Value engineering
 Design for manufacture / Design for assembly
 Reverse costing
 Cost driver analysis
Activity-based costing (ABC), which assigns a cost of each activity undertaken in the production and delivery of each product and service according to the actual consumption by each activity including a share of overheads. Peter Turney in a 1989 article examines the role of ABC in the achievement of manufacturing excellence and the product cost information needed by managers working towards this goal.
 Product benchmarking
Competitor benchmarking
 Design to cost
 Design workshops with suppliers
Half cost strategies: ambitious strategies which aim to reduce the costs of specific production processes or value adding stages to 1/N of the previous cost.

References

Further reading

See also
Potential analysis
Productivity
Efficiency

Costs